The Ubon Ratchathani Candle Festival, the most elaborate of the traditional parading of candles to wats, is held in Ubon Ratchathani, Isan, Thailand, around the days at of Asanha Puja (which commemorates Lord Buddha's first sermon) and Wan Kao Pansa (which marks the beginning of vassa).

At the start of the Lenten period, it is traditional in preparation for the rainy season for the devout to donate to items for the personal use of monks, and of candles to dispel gloom in their quarters and elsewhere within the wat. The latter is often the core event of many village celebrations, but is at its most elaborate in the Ubon Ratchathani version, which nowadays is a major event both for residents and for tourists: giant candles are paraded through the town, each representing a local temple, district or other institution.  The more elaborate versions are accompanied by scenes of Hindu and Buddhist mythology sculpted in wood or plaster and coated with wax. Of course, these candles are never burned.

 The candles are carved a couple of days before the procession.
On Asanha Bucha day, the candles are taken to Thung Si Mueang, a park in the middle of the city, where they are decorated and then exhibited in the evening.   On the same evening, there are small processions with lighted candles at several temples.

The procession takes place on the morning of Wan Kao Pansa.  The candles are paraded through the city centre on floats, accompanied by representatives of the respective institutions.  These are normally dancers or musicians in traditional dress.

In addition to the above, the festival is accompanied by the usual paraphernalia of feasting and games which attend any Thai festival.

See also 
 Asalha Puja
 Dhammacakkappavattana Sutta
 Isan culture
 Ubon Ratchathani
 History of Isan
 Wan Ok Phansa
 Vassa

External links

Pictures of Candle Festivalby Ubon Ratchathani city municipality 
Candle Festival 2009 Candle Festival 2009
Pictures and Stories of Candle Festival 2013 Photostory about Candle Festival 2013

Isan
Buddhist holidays
Buddhist festivals in Thailand
Tourist attractions in Ubon Ratchathani province
Candles